Who Lie in Gaol is a 1952 work  by the British writer Joan Henry. It is semi-autobiographical novel, based on Henry's own experiences serving a prison sentence for passing a fraudulent cheque. The title is drawn from Oscar Wilde's The Ballad of Reading Gaol. She followed the success of the work with another bestseller Yield to the Night.

Film adaptation
In 1953 it was adapted into the film The Weak and the Wicked directed by J. Lee Thompson and starring Glynis Johns, Diana Dors and John Gregson.

References

Bibliography
 Chibnall, Steve. J. Lee Thompson. Manchester University Press,  2021.
 Goble, Alan. The Complete Index to Literary Sources in Film. Walter de Gruyter, 1999.
 Schwan, Anne. Convict Voices: Women, Class, and Writing about Prison in Nineteenth-Century England. University of New Hampshire Press, 2 Dec 2014.

1952 British novels
British novels adapted into films
Victor Gollancz Ltd books
British autobiographical novels